The 1979 United Kingdom general election in Northern Ireland was held on 3 May with 12 MPs elected in single-seat constituencies using first-past-the-post as part of the wider general election in the United Kingdom.

Results
The election was after Labour Party prime minister James Callaghan lost a vote of confidence by 311 votes to 310. The election was won by the Conservative Party led by Margaret Thatcher, and began a period of 18-year government by the party.

Ulster Unionist leader Harry West failed to win a seat for the second time, and would resign later that year after failing to win a seat at the first European Parliament election. The Democratic Unionist Party increased its representation, and the Vanguard Unionist Progressive Party had disbanded.

Frank Maguire was re-elected as an Independent Nationalist, beating the leaders of both the UUP and the new United Ulster Unionist Party, as well as Austin Currie, a member of the SDLP standing without the support of the party. Maguire's death on 5 March 1981 led by a by-election won by Bobby Sands, an IRA prisoner who died later that year as a result of a hunger strike. The Representation of the People Act 1981 disqualified prisoners detained for more than a year from membership of the House of Commons, so the resulting by-election was contested by Sands's election agent Owen Carron, rather than by another prison on hunger strike.

MPs elected

By-elections

References

Northern Ireland
1979
1979 elections in Northern Ireland